Statistics of the Scottish Football League in season 1909–10.

Scottish League Division One

Scottish League Division Two

See also
1909–10 in Scottish football

References

 
1909-10